South Carolina Highway 2 (SC 2) is a state highway in the U.S. state of South Carolina that travels  between two portions of U.S. Route 21/U.S. Route 176/U.S. Route 321 (US 21/US 176/US 321) in Lexington County. The southern  of the highway are known as Frink Street while the northern  of the highway are known as State Street.

Route description
It begins at the US 21/US 176/US 321 concurrency heading northeast. It then takes a turn to the north and runs parallel to the Congaree River to its west. Shortly after passing US 1, the highway ends at US 378 in West Columbia. The highway runs by an elementary school, Brookland-Cayce High School, two shopping centers, and a park.

History
SC 2 is one of the original state highways. It was considered the state's "Main Street" in the 1920s and 1930s. The road began construction in 1923 and ended 11 years later in 1932. The road was re-designated as US 76, US 176 and US 178 in the 1940s and has been reduced to just under . Additionally, only the Frink Street portion of the route is signed.

Major intersections

Little Mountain alternate route

South Carolina Highway 2 Alternate (SC 2 Alt.) was a short alternate route that was a different path from Little Mountain to Slighs. Both of its termini were at U.S. Route 76 (US 76) and SC 2. It was established between 1939 and 1941 and was decommissioned in 1947. It was downgraded to a secondary road.

See also

References

External links

002
Transportation in Lexington County, South Carolina
U.S. Route 76